Ashbury railway station was located on the Okehampton to Bude Line 3¾ miles east of Halwill Junction, and served the hamlet of Ashbury and the village of Northlew in the English county of Devon.

History

Opened by the London and South Western Railway, the station was absorbed by the Southern Railway during the Grouping of 1923, In 1948 with nationalisation the station then passed on to the Southern Region of British Railways and later Western Region of British Railways. The station was subsequently closed by the British Railways Board.

The site today

References
 
 
 
 Station on navigable O. S. map

Disused railway stations in Devon
Former London and South Western Railway stations
Railway stations in Great Britain opened in 1879
Railway stations in Great Britain closed in 1966
Beeching closures in England